Andapura is a village in the southern state of Karnataka, India. It is located in the Anekal taluk of Bangalore Urban district. As per a 2011 census, its population was 1,769.

References

Villages in Bangalore Urban district